Lynda Kiejko (née Hare born 13 September 1980 in Winchester, Ontario, Canada) is a Canadian pistol sport shooter.

Kiejko started off 2015 with a career high 6th-place finish at a World Cup event in Changwon, South Korea in the 10m air pistol event and then later won two gold medals at the 2015 Pan American Games in Toronto, and therefore secured a quota place for the 2016 Summer Olympics. She follows in the footsteps of her sister Dorothy Ludwig, who qualified for the 2012 Summer Olympics.

In May 2016, she was officially named to Canada's team for the 2016 Olympics. She finished in 38th place in both the Women's 10 metre air pistol and the Women's 25 metre pistol events.

She represented Canada at the 2020 Summer Olympics.

Her father, Bill Hare, was a three-time Olympian in shooting for Canada.

References

External links
 
 

Canadian female sport shooters
Living people
Shooters at the 2014 Commonwealth Games
Shooters at the 2003 Pan American Games
Pan American Games gold medalists for Canada
Pan American Games bronze medalists for Canada
Shooters at the 2010 Commonwealth Games
Commonwealth Games bronze medallists for Canada
Shooters at the 2016 Summer Olympics
Olympic shooters of Canada
1980 births
Commonwealth Games medallists in shooting
Pan American Games medalists in shooting
Shooters at the 2015 Pan American Games
Medalists at the 2015 Pan American Games
Shooters at the 2020 Summer Olympics
21st-century Canadian women
Medallists at the 2010 Commonwealth Games